Andhra Pradesh State Road Transport Corporation (APSRTC) is the state-owned road transport corporation in the Indian state of Andhra Pradesh. Its headquarters is located at NTR Administrative Block of RTC House in Pandit Nehru bus station of Vijayawada. Many other Indian metro towns in Telangana, Tamil Nadu, Karnataka, Odisha, Yanam, Kerala, Maharashtra and Chhattisgarh are also linked with the APSRTC services.

APSRTC was the first state to introduce cargo services and computized system in all depots. APSRTC was the first state to introduce hi-tech luxury bus in government bus sector in India.

 APSRTC was the first state transport which uses Live Bus tracking facilities for Tracking of buses. GPS (Global positioning system) is fixed in all types of buses. AIS 140 model, GPS devices are used for live tracking of buses.
 First to Introduce Digital Payments, QR - Tickets, E-Pos machines for ticketing across entire State.

History 
APSRTC was formed on 11 January 1958 as per "Road Transport Corporations Act 1950". Earlier, it was a part of Nizam State Rail and Road Transport Department. Consequent upon bifurcation of Andhra Pradesh state into Telangana and residual Andhra Pradesh, TSRTC is operated as a separate entity from 3 June 2015. APSRTC is working from Vijayawada (Pandit Nehru Bus Stand) as Headquarters for the state of Andhra Pradesh.

Administration 
The organisation is divided into four zones with twelve Regional Managers. It has a total of 11,678 buses (government-owned 8964; hire on rental 2714) operating in  kilometers and has a total of 426 bus stations and 129 bus depots. From 30 January 2019, all the APSRTC vehicles in the state are registered as AP–39, followed by "Z" and four digits.

Types of Services 

APSRTC operates NON -OPRS, OPRS, Cargo Services

 NON - OPRS - Non Online Passenger Reservation System
These Services are Non Reservation  Short Distance Services.These Services are Operated from Morning 4AM to Night 9PM. Short Distance District and City Service's comes under this Category.

Facilities in NON - OPRS SERVICES:-
Live tracking Facility.
Bus Time Table for Non Reservation Services. Except City Services, Live tracking Facility is Available for District Services.

 OPRS - Online Passenger Reservation System 
Long distance Reservation Services Comes under this Category. 
These services are Operated during Night and Day as Reservation Services 
. Mostly Ultra Deluxe, Semi Sleeper, A/C, Sleeper Classes comes under this Category. More than 250 km distance these services are operated.

Facilities in OPRS Services:-
Reservation Facility, Live Bus Tracking Facility.Bus Time Table in Live Track App.

 Cargo Service
These cargo Services are rapid in APSRTC. These Services are offerd to public to transport Bulk goods to their door step. DGT (Depot Goods Trucks) are used to transport Bulk goods materials.
 
 Services operated Under NON - OPRS
NON-OPRS - NON ONLINE PASSENGER SYSTEM
 Pallevelugu  (Ordinary)
 Ultra Pallevelugu (L.H / Fast Passenger)
 Express
Saptagiri Express 
Saptagiri Express (Electric)
 Ultra Deluxe (Non - Stop Inter City Service)
 Super Luxury (Non - Stop Inter City Service)
 Indra A/C (Non - Stop Inter City Services)
 City Ordinary ( City Service )
 Metro Express ( City Service )
Metro Deluxe ( City Service )
Metro Luxury A/C (Non - Stop Inter City & Airport Services)
Services Operated Under OPRS
 
OPRS  - Online Passenger Reservation System
Express
Saptagiri Express 
Ultra Deluxe
Super Luxury
Indra A/C
Metro Luxury A/C
Garuda  A/C
Garuda Plus A/C
Amaravati Multi Axle A/C
Dolphin Cruise A/C
Star Liner ( Non A/C Sleeper )
Night Rider (Seater cum Sleeper) A/C
Vennela Sleeper A/C

Amaravathi (Multi Axle A/C) 
The brand name "Amaravathi" is named after Capital City Name of Andhrapradesh.
Amaravathi Multiple Axle are A/C Buses operated as Inter city services. These buses are operated as Night and  Day Reservation services.

Facilities:-
Reservation, Live tracking  facility is available for this services. Waterbottle, tissues are provided.

Dolphin Cruise (Multi Axle A/C) 

Brand Name  " Dolphin Cruise" is used after, the Dolphin Nose Hills in Visakhapatnam. These services are launched to Connect Visakhapatnam City from Main Cities in Andhrapradesh. 
These Buses are the longest in length among all buses in APSRTC fleet. These buses are operated as Inter city Night services and Day Services .

Facilities:-
Water Bottle, Newspaper, tissues are provided.
Reservation, live tracking facilities are available for this services.

Vennela (Sleeper A/C) 
Vennela Sleeper are Air conditioner services operated by APSRTC. These Services are Long Distance Sleeper Services. These fleet are Operated during night traveling, for good relax Sleeping.
These buses are operated to major cities such as Chennai, Bengaluru, Hyderabad, Vijayawada, Visakhapatnam, Kakinada.

Facilities:-
Waterbottle, Napkins, Reading Lamp, wide and Soft Cushioned Berths . Reservation facility, Live Tracking facility Available.

Night Rider (Seater Cum Sleeper A/C) 
These Services operated by APSRTC are Sleeper Cum Seater A/C coaches. These buses are available with Sleeper berths as well as seats. These buses are operated as Night Service to Most cities such as Hyderabad, Visakhapatnam, Vijayawada, Kakinada, Chennai, Bengaluru.

Facilities:-

Reading Lamp, Soft Cushioned Berths & Seats, Waterbottle, Napkins, Blankets . Reservation Facility, Live tracking facility available.

Star Liner (Non -A/C Sleeper) 

The brand name "star" refers to, (S)-Sleep  (T)-Travel (A)-And (R)-Relax.
These are Non A/C Sleeper Coaches . These are the first Non A/C Sleeper Coaches in fleet of APSRTC.These services are newly started in Month of November 2022.

Facilities
Soft Cushioned Sleeper Berths, 2+1 upper and lower berths, Reading lamps, Bed lamps, Pillos and Bed Sheets Provided. Reservation facility, Live tracking available.

Garuda Plus (Multi Axle A/C) 
The facilities in this Garuda Plus is same as Amaravathi and Dolphin Cruise (Multi Axle A/C) Coaches.

Present Status ( Replaced and Discontinued):-
Now, this brand is replaced with Amaravathi and Dolphin cruise (Multi Axle) buses.

Garuda (A/C) 

These services are operated as Day and Night inter city Reservation services . These buses are operated to cities such as Visakhapatnam, Tirupati, Kakinada, Vijayawada, Hyderabad, Bengaluru.

Facilities:-
Semi Sleeper Seats, Soft Cushioned Seats. Reservation facility, Live tracking facility available.

Indra (A/C) 

These A/C bus services are less costlier than Other A/C services in APSRTC. 
The fare of this service are much higher than super luxury and lower than Garuda (A/C) Services.
These buses are operated as Night Reservation Services from main / small Towns to Major cities.

Facilities:-
Semi Sleeper / Rectilinear Seats. Reservation facility, Live tracking facility available.

Metro Luxury (A/C) 
These are the A/C services operated Between major towns and cities as Inter City Services. 
These buses are operated as Airport Services, Reservation and Non - Reservation Intercity Services. Fare of this services are same as super luxury service
Facilities:-
Reservation Facility and Live Tracking Facility are available.

Note:-
Especially These services are operated between
Visakhapatnam to  Srikakulam, Kakinada, Rajahmundry.
Vijayawada Autonagar to Ongole, Guntur, Bhimavaram.

Super Luxury (Non A/C Seater) 

These Buses are operated as Night and Day Reservation Services Between Main Towns and Cities in Andhra Pradesh.
These buses are Majority of fleet in reservation category of APSRTC  .
The fare of this buses are higher than Ultra Deluxe Services because It is comfortable. These are 2+2 Non A/C Service with Air Suspension Coach facilities.

Facilities:-
Soft Cushioned Rectilinear Seats, Air Suspension Coach, TV facility. Reservation facility, live tracking facility available.

Ultra Deluxe / Deluxe 

These buses are operated as Inter city Reservation services and Non reservation services .
These Services are also operated as Non - Stop Services Between Major Towns and District Headquarters.
These are 2+2 seating Non A/C services .
The fare of this services are Much higher than Express and Pallevelugu (ordinary) services.

Facilities:-
2+2 Semi Sleeper Rectilinear Seats, Reservation facility, live tracking facility.

Express 
These services are operated as Inter city Services from Mandal Headquarters, District headquarters to main towns and cities in Andhra Pradesh.
These Buses are 3+2 seating Non A/C services operated by APSRTC. Fare of this buses are Higher than ordinary "Palle velugu" services.

Pallevelugu (Ordinary Service) 
The Brand Name "Pallevelugu" mean, "Palle- Village", "Velugu- light" (Light to Villages).
These buses brings new light to villages in Andhra Pradesh by providing bus services to villagers to fulfill their needs.
These are rural service offered by APSRTC.
These buses are the Majority of number in APSRTC fleet.
These services connects Mandals, Villages, Towns and District headquarters in Andhrapradesh.

Ultra Pallevelugu (L.H Ordinary Service) 
These are Limited Halt (L.H) ordinary services offered by APSRTC. These services as similar to "Pallevelugu" Rural Bus service with Less number of stops.
Fare of this services are between "Pallevelugu" and "Express" services.

Saptagiri Express ( Electric )
These are first Electric run buses in  APSRTC fleet.This project was Implemented to "Go Green" in Tirumala Tirupathi Ghat Section.
These buses are replaced In place of diesel buses, to reduce pollution in tirumala tirupathi route. These Buses are operated by APSRTC and Made by oelectra.
Upcoming days, Disel Saptagiri buses will be replaced with Electric traction motors  to over come the Pollution in Tirumala Tirupathi Ghat.

 Facilities:-
Soft Cushioned Seats, Air Conditioner coach, Live tracking facility available.

Saptagiri Express 
The brand "Sapthagiri" mean "Seven hills" of Tirumala Tirupati.
These are Express Services operated along Tirumala ghat section to carry pilgrims to Tirumala temple from Major cities and towns .

Facilities:-
Reservation facility is available for Bengaluru, Chennai, Vellore, Kallakuruchi, Hosur, Dharmapuri, Krishnagiri, Kanchipuram, Tiruvannamalai. Live Tracking Facility is Available.

Metro Express ( City Service )
These are Limited Halt (L.H) city express Services operated on City Routes as well as Intet city L.H services.

City Ordinary ( City Service ) 
These are the ordinary Services operated by APSRTC In major cities of Andhra Pradesh.
These City ordinary services are operated in Visakhapatnam, Vijayawada, Guntur, Tirupati as city ordinary services.

Metro Deluxe 
These are City Express services operated as limited Halt (L.H) service. These buses are A/C and Non A/C services operated in Major Cities to connect Important Areas and tourist spots in the cities. These buses are Operated under JNNURM Scheme.

Present Status :- Replaced and Discontinued 
These services are now replaced with "Metro Express" and "Metro Luxury" Services.

DGT ( Depot Goods Truck ) 

These services offered by APSRTC to Carry Parcels, Couriers, Goods and Bulk Materials.
These services can be booked and utilised by Public for Shifting their goods and valuables.
Every Bus depot in APSRTC having one DGT Bus.
These Services having door step cargo delhivery facility.

Performance and earnings 
, the organisation has a gross earnings of  ₹5,995 crores, and with an accumulated loss of ₹6,445 crores.

Depots 
APSRTC has 129 depots across the state. All the 129 depots are 100% computerized.

List of Depots in APSRTC 

 Addanki
 Adoni
 Alipiri
 Allagadda
 Amalapuram
 Anantapur
 Anakapalli
 Atmakur - Kurnool District 
 Atmakur - Nellore District 
 Avanigadda

 Badvel
Banaganapally
 Bapatla
 Bhimavaram
 BHEL Ramachandrapuram (Hyderabad)
 Chilakaluripeta
 Chirala
 Chittoor -1
 Chittoor -2
 Dharmavaram
 Dhone
 Eleswaram
 Eluru
 Gajuwaka
 Giddaluru
 Gokavaram
 Gooty
 Gudivada
 Gudur
 Guntakal
 Guntur -1
 Guntur -2
 Hindupur
 Jagayyapeta
 Jammalamadugu
 Jangareddygudem
 Kadapa
 Kadiri
 Kakinada
 Kalyandurgam
 Kandukur
 kanigiri
 Kavali
 Koilakuntla
 Kovvur
 Kuppam
 Kurnool -1
 Kurnool -2
 Macherla
 Machilipatnam
 Madanapally -1
 Madanapally -2
 Madakasira
 Mangalagiri
 Markapur
 Mydukuru
 Nandikotkur
 Nandyal
 Narsipatnam
 Narsapuram
 Narsaraopeta
 Nellore -1
 Nellore -2
 Nidadavole
 Nuzvidu
 Ongole
 Paderu
 Palakonda
 Palamaneru
 Palasa
 Parvathipuram
 Pattikonda
 Penukonda
 Piduguralla
 Pileru
 Podili
 Ponnur
 Proddatur
 Pulivendula
 Punganur
 Puttaparthy
 Puttur
 Rajamahendravaram
 Rajampeta
 Razole
 Ramachandrapuram
 Rapur
 Ravulapalem
 Rayachoty
 Rayadurgam
 Repalle
 S.kota
 Salur
 Sattenapalle
 Satyavedu
 Srikakulam -1
 Srikakulam -2
 Srikalahasti
 Sullurpeta
 Tadepalligudem
 Tadipatri
 Tanuku
 Tekkali
 Tenali
 Tirupathi
 Tirumala
Mangalam 
 Tiruvur
 Tuni
 Udayagiri
 Uravakonda
 Vakadu
 Venkatagiri

 Vijayawada
Jawahar Autonagar 
Governorpeta -1 
Governorpeta -2 
Ibrahimpatnam
 Gannavaram
Krishnalanka
Vidyadharapuram
 Vinukonda

 Visakhapatnam
Dwaraka Nagar
Madurawada
Maddilapalem 
Simhachalam 
 VSC Steel city 
Waltair
 Vizianagaram
 Vuyyuru
 Yemmiganur

Zones 

APSRTC having 4 Zones . Maintenance and refurbishment of buses are carried out here. These Zonal workshops having High technology featured equipment for maintenance and refurbishment of buses.

 Vizianagaram
 Vijayawada
 Nellore
 Kadapa

Regions 

APSRTC having 12 regions across the state. Following are the 12 regions of APSRTC.

 Anantapur
 Chittoor
 East Godavari
 Guntur
 Kadapa
 Krishna
 Kurnool
 North Central region (NEC Region), Vizianagaram Region
 Nellore
 Prakasam
 Tirupati
 Visakhapatnam
 West Godavari

Passenger Amenities and Mobile App's from APSRTC

Mobile App / web portal  to Book Reservation Ticket 

 Mobile app and web portal for Online Reservation  is designed and provided for passengers to book tickets at Home, Dining and Shopping.
 Reservation counters are also provided at bus stations .

 This feature reduces Crowd at reservation conters, reduces money retail issues and makes passengers to book tickets easy and make travel better .

Bus Live Tracking App and Web Portal for Passengers 
 APSRTC LIVE TRACK is an APP offered by APSRTC,  for live tracking and live location of buses. 
 This future helps passengers to get live Location of buses on electronic maps (Google Maps, OpenStreetMap), designed in APP and Web portal .
 Bus live tracking facility is Provided for NON -OPRS and OPRS Bus Services.
 Passengers can estimate Buses arrival to Bus stand, Bus stops  enroute . 
 Backend servers are used for control of this Bus live tracking feature.
 This feature is Mostly used by Remote villages to know about District ordinary Services.
 Submit of feed back on Bus condition, Diver and Conductor Behaviour, Women Safety, Breakdown, Report Accident features are provided.
 Passengers can interact with Depot managers, Regional managers, Zonal managers by phone numbers provided in the app .
 Passengers can search and locate nearby Bus stops using the GPS location of their phone .

Amenities Provided for Passengers at Bus Stands/Stations 
 All the bus station across the state are modified under State of Art and passenger amenities are provided such as Dormitories, Waiting longues, Shops and Stalls, Drinking water facilities.
 Public Toilets under Swach Bharat Mission are Provided for Passengers.

APSRTC Digital Payments 

 APSRTC Is implementing Digital Payments in OPRS and NON - OPRS buses.
 Android E-POS Machine's (Electronic Point of Sale) are provided to APSRTC Staff.
Digital Payments in Cargo Booking.
 Credit & debit card Payments.
RFID Bus pass scanning.
 Call center.
 Command Control Centre (CCC).
 Booking of Non reservation bus tickets and generation of QR code
 Issuing E-PoS Machines for offline Bus ticket generating using QR, Bus Tracking and live location.
 Replacement of Existing TIM Machines and Providing E-Pos machines for seamless Connectivity.

Awards and achievements 
 It entered the Guinness Book of World Records on 31 October 1999, with 22,000 buses making it the largest bus fleet in the world.
 Highest km/L (Kilometers per liter) fuel efficiency for 2011–12 – Mofussil services and Vijayawada (urban division)
 Best Road Safety record for 2012–13

Andhra Pradesh State Road Transport Corporation has a number of firsts to its credit in India.
 First to nationalize passenger Road Transport Services in the country – 1932
 First to introduce long-distance night express services
 First to introduce A/C Sleeper, Hi-tech, Metro Liner, Inter-City Services and Metro Express
 First to introduce depot computerisation – 1986
 First to appoint Safety Commissioner for improving the safety of passengers
 All 126 depots in the state are computerized
 Reservation of tickets on telephone and door delivery of tickets
 Award from The Indian Express in digital technology to category of enterprise application. This is fifth award in a row for APSRTC in this category event held in Kochi on 25 February 2023.

See also 
 Nizam State Rail and Road Transport Department.

References

External links 

 

Transport companies established in 1958
Transport in Andhra Pradesh
State agencies of Andhra Pradesh
State road transport corporations of India
1958 establishments in Andhra Pradesh
Companies based in Vijayawada
Bus companies of India